Silvia Curteanu, (Ph.D., 1998), is a Romanian chemist, who is active in the field of environmental science; she is a professor of the Gheorghe Asachi Technical University of Iași (TUIASI).

Works 
 Modelling and simulation applied to free radical polymerization (Ph.D. thesis, 1998)

Literature 
 Polymer Engineering / eds. Bartosz Tylkowski, Karolina Wieszczycka, Renata Jastrzab. — Berlin; Boston: De Gruyter, 2017. — 490 p. — . — .
 Raluca-Maria Hlihor, Laura-Carmen Apostol, Maria Gavrilescu. Environmental Bioremediation by Biosorption and Bioaccumulation: Principles and Applications // Enhancing Cleanup of Environmental Pollutants. — Cham: Springer International Publishing, 2017. — P. 289–315. — . — DOI:10.1007/978-3-319-55426-6 14.

References

Additional sources 
 

Romanian chemists
Romanian women chemists
Academic staff of the Gheorghe Asachi Technical University of Iași
Year of birth missing (living people)
Living people